Kaka Hathrasi (18 September 1906 – 18 September 1995) was a Hindi satirist and humorist poet of India.

Life and career

Hathrasi was born as Prabhu Lal Garg. He wrote under the pen name Kaka Hathrasi. He chose "Kaka", as he played the character in a play which made him popular, and "Hathrasi" after the name of his hometown Hathras. He has 42 works to his credit, comprising a collection of humorous and satirical poems, prose and plays published by various publishers. He also wrote three books on Indian classical music under the pen name "Vasant". In 1932, he established Sangeet Karyalaya (initially Garg and Co.), a publishing house for the books on Indian classical music and dance and started publishing a monthly magazine Sangeet in 1935. Sangeet is the only periodical on Indian classical music and dance that has been continuously published for over 78 years.

He was awarded Padma Shri by the government of India in 1985. Today, each year, the Delhi-based "Hindi Academy" awards the annual Kaka Hathrasi Award for outstanding contribution in the literary field.

Works

Humorous poetry
  Kaka Tarang. Diamond Pocket Books (P) Ltd., 2005.  .
 Kaka Ki Chaupal. Diamond Pocket Books (P) Ltd., 2006, .
 Jai Bolo Baiman Ki, Diamond Pocket Books (P) Ltd., 2006. .
 Mera Jeevan : A-One (Autobiography), Diamond Pocket Books (P) Ltd., 1993. .

Film production
Kaka Hathrasi  and his son Laxminarayan Garg made a Brij Bhasha-language feature film "Jamuna Kinare" (1983) which  based on Braj culture. The film is made under the  banner of "Kaka Hathrasi Films Production", produced, directed and music composed by  Laxminarayan Garg  and story was written by Ashok Chakradhar (Kaka Hathrasi 's son-in-law,husband of Kaka's niece, Ms Bageshri)

References

External links
 Sangeet Karyalaya, Hathras' website
 Brief introduction and a large collection of poems at IndiaWorld on the Net
Poetry
 Kaka Hathrasi at Kavita Kosh (Hindi)
 Brief introduction and some poems at Anubhuti Hindi

1906 births
1995 deaths
Hindi-language writers
People from Hathras
Indian satirists
Hindi-language poets
Indian humorists
Recipients of the Padma Shri in literature & education
Indian publishers (people)
Indian autobiographers
20th-century Indian poets
Indian male poets
Poets from Uttar Pradesh
20th-century Indian male writers
20th-century pseudonymous writers